James Render Terrell Sr. (born August 10, 1868) was a lawyer, solicitor general, and state legislator in Georgia. Two of his sons also served in the state legislature.

James Render Terrell Jr. served in the Georgia House of Representatives from 1935 to 1938 representing Troup County.

References

1868 births
Year of death unknown
Place of birth unknown
Place of death unknown
Members of the Georgia General Assembly
19th-century American lawyers
19th-century American politicians